Mohamad Azmi bin Muslim (born 17 October 1986) is a Malaysian professional footballer who plays as a left-back for Malaysia Super League club PDRM.

Club career

Early career
Azmi began his football career with UPB-MyTeam before signed with Kedah.

International career
He was a member of the Malaysia national under-23 football team and a member of the 2009 Laos Sea Games Football Gold medal winning squad. He has played for the Malaysian national football team, and in 2009 he played twice against Uzbekistan in the 2011 AFC Asian Cup qualification.

Career statistics

Club

Honours

Club
Selangor
 Malaysia Cup: 2015

Penang
 Malaysia Premier League: 2020

International
 Southeast Asian Games  Gold Medal: 2009
 AFF Suzuki Cup runner-up: 2014

References

Malaysian footballers
Living people
1986 births
Sportspeople from Penang
UPB-MyTeam FC players
Johor Darul Ta'zim F.C. players
Selangor FA players
PKNS F.C. players
Kedah Darul Aman F.C. players
People from Penang
Malaysian people of Malay descent
Malaysia Super League players
Association football defenders
Association football midfielders
Southeast Asian Games medalists in football
Southeast Asian Games gold medalists for Malaysia